Under the Rouge is a 1925 American silent drama film directed by Lewis H. Moomaw and starring Eileen Percy, Tom Moore and Eddie Phillips. After being arrested for safe-breaking, a man goes home to try and patch things up with his former girlfriend.

Plot
As described in a film magazine reviews, Kitty and Whitey are drawn into the criminal underworld by circumstances although basically they are of fine metal. When the war comes, Whitey receives military decorations for bravery. Returning home to the United States, he is again tempted to enter his old haunts. Kitty is now a beautiful young woman. Although Whitey has always loved her, she regards him like a brother. Whitey and his pal Skeeter are caught during a robbery. Skeeter is killed and Whitey is convicted. But a friendly detective urges him to “go straight” and secures his release. Kitty has become friends with Martha who, it is learned, is Skeeter’s mother. Fred, cashier of the bank and a visitor at the house, has fallen in love with her. Whitey finally locates Kitty and learns that Martha is the mother of his pal Skeeter. He tells her that her boy died fighting in his arms and relinquishes his Croix de Guerre as having been Skeeter’s. Martha adopts him and he secures a job at the bank. Fred is dishonest and is planning to fix an embezzlement at the bank, of which he is guilty, on Whitey, counting on his past record. Whitey exposes him, rescues Kitty from a hazardous death, and in the end they are happily united.

Cast

Production
Under the Rouge was filmed on location in Portland, Oregon.

References

Bibliography
 Monaco, James. The Encyclopedia of Film. Perigee Books, 1991.

External links

1925 films
1925 drama films
Silent American drama films
Films directed by Lewis H. Moomaw
Films shot in Portland, Oregon
American silent feature films
1920s English-language films
American black-and-white films
Associated Exhibitors films
1920s American films